Brilliant is a creator-owned comic book series written by Brian Michael Bendis published under Marvel Comics' Icon imprint. The title is illustrated by Mark Bagley.

References

Marvel Comics limited series
Comics by Brian Michael Bendis